James Dykes (12 October 1916 – 1974) was a Scottish footballer who played as a centre half. Born in Law, South Lanarkshire, he played for Heart of Midlothian and appeared twice for the Scotland national football team in 1938, also taking part in a SFA tour of North America the following summer. His senior career was effectively curtailed by the Second World War, during which he played for Hearts and made guest appearances for a variety of clubs in England and Northern Ireland, also being selected for four unofficial wartime internationals. After ending his playing career in 1951, Dykes emigrated to Australia.

References

External links

1916 births
1974 deaths
Footballers from South Lanarkshire
Association football central defenders
Scottish footballers
Scotland international footballers
Scotland wartime international footballers
Scottish Football League players
NIFL Premiership players
Heart of Midlothian F.C. players
Ayr United F.C. players
Blackpool F.C. wartime guest players
Charlton Athletic F.C. wartime guest players
Chelsea F.C. wartime guest players
Glentoran F.C. players
Dundela F.C. players
Portadown F.C. players
Newry City F.C. players
Ross County F.C. players
Scottish Football League representative players
Scottish emigrants to Australia
Place of death missing